Christ's Hospital, Ipswich was established in Tudor Ipswich, Suffolk. The original benefactors were Robert Felaw, William Smarte and Henry Tooley.

References

Ipswich